Touchtennis is a modified version of tennis played on a compact court with foam balls and shorter rackets. It is regularly featured on Sky Sports and is growing in popularity and acceptance as an alternative form of the full size game.

Former and current ATP Players include Fernando Gonzalez, Marcus Willis, Jeff Tarango and Chris Eaton. TV personality Bear Grylls plays tournaments and is a vocal supporter as is  comedian Miranda Hart. 

It is also used as a tool by the Lawn Tennis Association in the United Kingdom and the RFET in Spain to increase the number of people playing an adaptation of tennis.

History 
Touchtennis was created by Rashid Ahmad as a means of entertaining his young daughter in the back garden. It was developed to include a tour, complete with rankings, 4 major Grand Slams as well as Masters events and other smaller tournaments that offer a lower value of ranking points.

Equipment

Rackets 

Balls 
Special foam balls have been developed to withstand heavy hitting.

Court 

References

External links 

touchtennis website.

Forms of tennis
Ball games
Racket sports
Sports originating in England